Citizenship of the United States of America can be acquired in different ways, one of those being naturalization.

Art and literature

Authors
 Jackie Collins – Born in the United Kingdom. Became a U.S. citizen in 1960.
 Thomas B. Costain – Born in Canada. Became an American citizen in 1920.
 Immaculée Ilibagiza – Born and raised in Rwanda. Became a U.S. citizen in 2013.
 Klaus Mann – Born in Germany. Became a U.S. citizen in 1943.
 David Morrell – Born and raised in Canada. Became a U.S. citizen in 1993.
 Gerda Weissmann Klein – Born and raised in Poland. Became a U.S. citizen in 1948.

Architect
 César Pelli – Born and raised in Argentina. Became a U.S. citizen in 1964
 I. M. Pei

Journalists
 Masih Alinejad – Born and raised in Iran. Became a U.S. citizen in 2019.
 Cecilia Alvear – Born in Ecuador. Became a U.S. citizen in 1984.
 Piotr Domaradzki – Born and raised in Poland. Became a U.S. citizen in 1996.
 Veronique Peck – Born in France. Became a U.S. citizen in 1976.
 Hari Sreenivasan – Born in India. Became a U.S. citizen in 2008.

Painters
 José Bernal – Born in Cuba. Became an American citizen in 1980.
 Janice Biala – Born in Poland. Became an American citizen in 1929.
 Dorothy Brett – Born in the United Kingdom. Became a U.S. citizen in 1938
 Rudolf Cronau – Born in Germany. Became a U.S. citizen in 1901.
 Marcel Duchamp – Born and raised in France. Became a U.S. citizen in 1955.
 Pál Fried – Born and raised in Hungary. Emigrated to the U.S. in 1946 becoming a citizen in 1953. 
 Charles Hoffbauer – Born and raised in France. Became a U.S. citizen in 1941.
 Tania Marmolejo
 Mark Rothko – Born and raised in Russia. Became a U.S. citizen in 1938.

Sculptors
 Louise Bourgeois – Born and raised in France. Became a U.S. citizen in 1951.
 Luigi Del Bianco
 Enrico Cerracchio – Born in Italy, emigrated to the U.S. in 1900 becoming a citizen in 1905.
 Anthony de Francisci – Born and raised in Italy. Became a U.S. citizen in 1913.
 Arturo Di Modica

Writers
 Isabel Allende
 Svetlana Alliluyeva 
 Flavio Alves – Born and raised in Brazil. Became a U.S. citizen in 2010.
 Isaac Asimov – Born in Russia, moved to the U.S. at the age of 3 becoming a citizen at the age of 8 in 1928.
 Anna Astvatsaturian Turcotte – Born in Azerbaijan and raised between there, Armenia and the United States. Became a U.S. citizen in 1997.
 W. H. Auden – Born and raised in the United Kingdom. Became a U.S. citizen in 1946.
 Isaac Bashevis Singer
 Vicki Baum – Born and raised in Austria. Became a U.S. citizen in 1938.
 Saul Bellow – Born and raised in Canada. Became a U.S. citizen in 1941.
 Helena Blavatsky – Born and raised in Russia (modern day Ukraine). Became a U.S. citizen in 1878
 Joseph Brodsky
 Carlos Castaneda – Born in Peru. Became a U.S. citizen in 1957.
 James Clavell – Born and raised in Australia. Became a U.S. citizen in 1963.
 Bernard Cornwell
 Ève Curie – Born and raised in France before becoming an American citizen in 1958
 Junot Díaz
 Anu Garg – Born in India. Became a U.S. citizen in 2008.
 Olga Grushin
 Claude McKay – Born in Jamaica. Became a U.S. citizen in 1940.
 Walter Mehring
 Vladimir Nabokov – Born and raised in Russia. Became a U.S. citizen in 1945.
 Otto Plath
 Ayn Rand – Born and raised in Russia. Became a U.S. citizen in 1931.
 David Rakoff
 Erich Maria Remarque – Born and raised in Germany. Immigrated to the U.S. in 1939 and became a citizen in 1947.
 Elie Wiesel
 Frances Wright

Business

Education
 Benjamin Akande
 Dieter Cunz
 Lorraine Eden
 Jaime Escalante

Entrepreneur
 Steve Chen
 Jawed Karim
 Iqbal Quadir – Born and raised in Bangladesh. Became a U.S. citizen later in life.

Fashion

Fashion designer
 Oleg Cassini
 Tan France – Born and raised in the United Kingdom. Became an American citizen in 2020.
 Diane von Fürstenberg
 Carolina Herrera – Born in Venezuela. Became an American citizen in 2009.
 Oscar de la Renta
 Ferdinando Sarmi

Models
 Heidi Albertsen – Born and raised in Denmark. Became a U.S. citizen in 2016.
 Camila Alves – Born in Brazil. Became a U.S. citizen in 2015.
 Alessandra Ambrosio
 Moran Atias – Born and raised in Israel. Became a U.S. citizen in 2017.
 Xenia Deli
 Heidi Klum – Born and raised in Germany. Became a U.S. citizen in 2008.
 Karolína Kurková – Born and raised in Czechoslovakia (modern day Czech Republic). Later became a naturalized U.S. citizen.
 China Machado
 Paulina Porizkova
 Claudia Romani
 Anne Vyalitsyna – Born and raised in Russia. Became a U.S. citizen in 2013.

Inventors
 Itzhak Bentov – Born and raised in Czechoslovakia (modern day Slovakia). Became a U.S. citizen in 1962.
 George Garrett – Born and raised in the United Kingdom. Became a U.S. citizen in 1902.
 Alexander Graham Bell
 Leo Gerstenzang
 James Hillier – Born in Canada. Became a U.S. citizen in 1945.
 Francis F. Lee – Born and raised in China. Became an American citizen in 1954.
 Fritz Karl Preikschat – Born and raised in Germany. Became a U.S. citizen in 1962.
 Nikola Tesla – Born in the Austrian Empire (modern day Croatia) to a family from Serbia. Became a U.S. citizen in 1891. 
 Arthur Wynne

Media tycoons
 Rupert Murdoch

Real estate
 Mark Taper
 Frederick Trump

Crime figures
 Ralph Capone
 Frank Costello – Born in Italy. Became a U.S. citizen in 1925.
 Tommy Lucchese
 Patrick Nee
 William Obront
 Santo Sorge
 William Tocco

Entertainment

Actors
 Michael Allinson – Born and raised in the United Kingdom. Became a U.S. citizen in 1964 after immigrating there in 1958.
 Robbie Amell – Born and raised in Canada. Became a U.S. citizen in 2020.
 Desi Arnaz
 Dan Aykroyd 
 Conrad Bain – Born and raised in Canada. Became an American citizen in 1946.
 Christian Bale
 Jamie Bamber
 John Barrowman
 Brian Bedford
 Demián Bichir
 Diego Boneta
 Stephen Boyd – Born and raised in the United Kingdom specifically Northern Ireland. Became a U.S. citizen in 1963.
 Charles Boyer – Born and raised in France. Became a U.S. citizen in 1942.
 Pierce Brosnan - Born and raised in Ireland. Became a U.S. citizen in 2004.
 Yul Brynner - Born in Far Eastern Republic (modern day Russia). Became a U.S. citizen in 1943.
 Jim Carrey – Born and raised in Canada. Became a U.S. citizen in 2004.
 Humberto Castro – Born in Mexico. Became a U.S. citizen in 2011.
 Maxwell Caulfield – Born and raised in the United Kingdom. Became an American citizen in 1991.
 Tommy Chong – Born and raised in Canada. Became a U.S. citizen in the 1980s.
 Andy Clyde – Born and raised in the United Kingdom. Became an American citizen in 1943.
 Alec Craig – Born and raised in the United Kingdom. Became a U.S. citizen in 1939.
 Hume Cronyn
 Alan Cumming – Born and raised in the United Kingdom specifically Scotland. Became an American citizen in 2008.
 Helmut Dantine – Born and Raised in Austria. Became a U.S. citizen in 1944.
 Alexander D'Arcy
 Wheeler Dryden – Born and raised in the United Kingdom. Became an American citizen in 1936.
 Alejandro Edda
 Maurice Evans
 Nathan Fillion – Born and raised in Canada. Became a U.S. citizen in 1997.
 James Finlayson – Born and raised in the United Kingdom. Became a U.S. citizen in 1942.
 Errol Flynn – Born and raised in Australia. Became an American citizen in 1942.
 Glenn Ford – Born and raised in Canada. Became a U.S. citizen in 1939.
 Michael J. Fox
 Andy García
 George Gaynes – Born in the Russian Empire (modern day Finland). Became a U.S. citizen in 1948.
 Daniel Goddard – Born and raised in Australia. Became a U.S. citizen in 2020.
 Lev Gorn
 Cary Grant – Born and raised in the United Kingdom. Became an American citizen in 1942.
 Jason Gray-Stanford – Born and raised in Canada. Became an American citizen in 2019.
 Anthony Hopkins – Born and raised in the United Kingdom. Became a U.S. citizen in 2000.
 Aharon Ipalé
 Makoto Iwamatsu
 Jason Jones – Born and raised in Canada. Became an American citizen in 2014.
 Werner Klemperer
 Kurt Kreuger
 Charles Laughton – Born and raised in the United Kingdom, becoming a U.S. citizen in 1950.
 Peter Lawford – Born and raised in the United Kingdom. Became a U.S. citizen in 1960.
 John Leguizamo
 Gene Lockhart – Born in Canada. Became a U.S. citizen in 1939
 Alexander Lockwood
 John Loder
 Daniel Logan - Born and raised in New Zealand. Became a U.S. citizen in 2007.
 Peter Lorre – Born and raised in Hungary (modern day Slovakia). Became a U.S. citizen in 1941.
 Bela Lugosi – Born and raised in Hungary. Became an American citizen in 1931.
 Keye Luke - Born in China. Became a U.S. citizen in 1943.
 Patrick Macnee
 James Mason
 Peter Mayhew – Born and raised in the United Kingdom. Became an American citizen in 2005.
 David McCallum – Born and raised in the United Kingdom. Became a U.S. citizen in 1999.
 Eric McCormack – Born and raised in Canada. Received U.S. citizenship in 1999.
 Roddy McDowall – Born and raised in the United Kingdom. Got U.S. citizenship in 1949.
 Kevin McKidd – Born and raised in the United Kingdom specifically Scotland. Got U.S. citizenship in 2015.
 Julian McMahon
 Peter McRobbie
 Alfred Molina – Born and raised in the United Kingdom. Became a U.S. citizen in 2004.
 Liam Neeson – Born and raised in the United Kingdom specifically Northern Ireland. Became a U.S. citizen in 2009.
 Leslie Nielsen
 Soon-Tek Oh
 Jason O'Mara – Born and raised in Ireland. Earned American citizenship in 2009.
 Dan O'Herlihy – Born and raised in Ireland. Became a U.S. citizen in 1983.
 Nathan Parsons
 Barry Pepper
 Walter Pidgeon – Born and raised in Canada. Became a U.S. citizen in 1943.
 Jürgen Prochnow – Born and raised in Germany. Became an American citizen in 2004.
 Ke Huy Quan
 Anthony Quinn – Born in Mexico to Irish immigrants. Became a U.S. citizen in 1947.
 Claude Rains – Born and raised in the United Kingdom. Became a U.S. citizen in 1939.
 Roger Rees – Born and raised in the United Kingdom specifically Wales. Became an American citizen in 1989.
 Duncan Renaldo
 Michael Rennie
 Alejandro Rey
 Ryan Reynolds – Born and raised in Canada. Became a U.S. citizen in 2018.
 Paul Rodriguez
 Tristan Rogers
 José Ruben - Born and raised in France. Became a U.S. citizen in 1920.
 Sabu
 Horatio Sanz – Born in Chile. Became an American citizen in 2018.
 Martin Short
Arnold Schwarzenegger
 Sebastian Stan – Born in Romania. Became a U.S. citizen in 2002.
 James Stephenson
 Lee Strasberg
 Gregg Sulkin – Born in the United Kingdom. Became a U.S. citizen in 2018.
 Francis L. Sullivan
 Carlos Valdes
 Steve Valentine
 Goran Višnjić
 Arnold Vosloo – Born and raised in South Africa becoming a naturalized U.S. Citizen in 1988.

Actresses
 Christine Adams – Born and raised in England before becoming a naturalized U.S. citizen in 2019.
 Neile Adams
 Anna Maria Alberghetti – Born in Italy. Became a U.S. citizen in 1961. 
 Malin Akerman – Born in Sweden, raised in Canada becoming a naturalized U.S. Citizen in 2018. 
 Ana Alicia
 Pamela Anderson – Born and raised in Canada became a naturalized U.S. citizen in 2004. 
 Fernanda Andrade
 Evelyn Ankers – Became a naturalized U.S. citizen in 1946 after growing up between South America and Europe.
 Gabrielle Anwar – Became a naturalized U.S. citizen in 2008.
 Jayne Atkinson
 Morena Baccarin
 Olga Baclanova – Born and raised in Russia. Became a U.S. citizen in 1931.
 Yetide Badaki – Born in Nigeria. Became a U.S. citizen in 2014.
 Jacinda Barrett – Born in Australia. Became an American citizen in 2009.
 Wendy Barrie – Became a naturalized U.S. citizen in 1942.
 Mischa Barton
 Frances Bay
 Stephanie Beatriz – Born in Argentina. Moved to the U.S. at the age of 2 becoming a naturalized Citizen at the age of 18.
 Catherine Bell
 Alma Beltran
 Ingrid Bergman – Born in Sweden. Became a U.S. citizen in 1945.
 Emily Blunt – Born and raised in the United Kingdom before becoming a naturalized U.S. citizen in 2015.
 Sônia Braga – Born in Brazil. Became a U.S. citizen in 2003.
 Antoinette Bower
 Natalie Burn – Born and raised in Ukraine. Became a U.S. citizen in 2018.
 Saffron Burrows – Born and raised in the United Kingdom. Became a U.S. citizen in 2009.
 Annette Carell – Born in Germany. Became a U.S. citizen in 1944.
 Madeleine Carroll – Born and raised in the United Kingdom. Became a U.S. citizen in 1943.
 Kim Cattrall 
 Loan Chabanol – Born in France. Became a U.S. citizen in 2020.
 Charo – Born in Spain. Became a U.S. citizen in 1977.
 Joan Chen – Born in China. Became a U.S. citizen in 1989.
 Emmanuelle Chriqui – Born in Canada. Became a U.S. citizen in 2017.
 Mady Christians
 Claudette Colbert
 Lili Darvas – Born and raised in Hungary becoming a naturalized U.S. citizen in 1944.
 Ludmila Dayer
 Olivia de Havilland
 Emilie de Ravin
 Portia de Rossi – Born and raised in Australia becoming a naturalized U.S. citizen in 2011.
 Yvonne De Carlo 
 Kate del Castillo
 Marlene Dietrich – Born and raised in Germany becoming a naturalized U.S. citizen in 1939 while renouncing her German citizenship.
 Diana Douglas
 Deanna Durbin – Born in Canada. Became a U.S. citizen in 1923.
 Marie Dressler
 Minnie Driver – Born in the United Kingdom raised in Barbados before becoming a U.S. citizen in 2017.
 Samantha Eggar
 Alice Eve - Born and raised in the United Kingdom specifically England. Became a U.S. citizen in 2017.
 Geraldine Fitzgerald – Born and raised in Ireland becoming a naturalized U.S. citizen in 1955.
 Nina Foch
 Megan Follows
 Joan Fontaine – Born in Japan to English parents raised in the United Kingdom. Became a naturalized U.S. citizen in 1943.
 Eva Gabor
 Zsa Zsa Gabor
 Greta Garbo – Born and raised in Sweden. Became a naturalized U.S. citizen in 1951.
 Greer Garson – Born and raised in the United Kingdom. Became a naturalized U.S. Citizen in 1951.
 Judy Geeson
 Melissa George - Born and raised in Australia. Became a U.S. citizen in 2008.
 Jessalyn Gilsig
 Shenae Grimes – Born and raised in Canada. Became a U.S. citizen in 2019.
 Emily Hampshire – Born and raised in Canada. Became a U.S. citizen in 2014.
 Joanna Hausmann
 Salma Hayek
 Tricia Helfer – Born in Canada. Became a U.S. citizen in 2011.
 Zulay Henao
 Sitara Hewitt
 Claire Holt – Born and raised in Australia. Became a U.S. citizen in 2019.
 Milla Jovovich
 Caroline Lagerfelt
 Stana Katic
 Violet Kemble-Cooper
 Diane Kruger – Born and raised in West Germany. Became a U.S. citizen in 2013.
 Mila Kunis
 Hedy Lamarr – Born and raised in Austria. Became a U.S. citizen in 1953.
 Elsa Lanchester
 Vicky Lane
 Angela Lansbury
 Eva Le Gallienne – Born in the United Kingdom. Became a U.S. citizen in 1927.
 Anna Lee
 Ruta Lee
 Rachelle Lefevre
 Eugenie Leontovich – Born and raised in Russia. Became a U.S. citizen in 1929.
 Margarita Levieva
 Bai Ling – Born and raised in China. Became a U.S. citizen in 1999.
 Kathleen Lockhart
 Celia Lovsky
 Camilla Luddington
 Ida Lupino – Born and raised in the United Kingdom. Became a U.S. citizen in 1948.
 Nola Luxford
 Sheila MacRae – Born and raised in the United Kingdom. Became a U.S. citizen in 1959.
 Mercedes Mason – Born in Sweden to parents from Iran. Became a U.S. citizen in 2016.
 Pamela Mason
 Ilona Massey – Born and raised in Hungary. Became a U.S. citizen in 1946.
 Ivana Miličević
 Marta Milans – Born in Spain. Became an American citizen in 2020.
 Kristine Miller – Born in Argentina. Became a U.S. citizen in 1942.
 Juliet Mills – Born and raised in the United Kingdom. Became a U.S. citizen in 1975.
 Helen Mirren - Born and raised in England. Became a U.S. citizen in 2017.
 Poppy Montgomery
 Carrie-Anne Moss
 Alla Nazimova
 Pola Negri – Born in Poland. Became a U.S. citizen in 1951.
 Sylvia O'Brien
 Una O'Connor – Born and raised in Ireland. Became a U.S. citizen in 1952.
 Catherine O'Hara
 Maureen O'Hara – Born and raised in Ireland. Became a U.S. citizen in 1946
 Sandra Oh – Born in Canada. Became a U.S. citizen in 2018.
 Maureen O'Sullivan – Born in Ireland. Became a U.S. citizen in 1947.
 Ann-Margret Olsson – Born in Sweden. Became an American citizen in 1949.
 Jessica Oyelowo – Born in the United Kingdom. Became a U.S. citizen in 2016.
 Bar Paly – Born in Russia raised in Israel. Became a U.S. citizen in 2016.
 Katina Paxinou - Born in Greece. Became a U.S. citizen in 1951.
 Mary Pickford
 Christina Pickles
 Sasha Pieterse
 Natalie Portman
 Nathalia Ramos – Born in Spain. Became a U.S. citizen in 2016.
 Italia Ricci – Born and raised in Canada. Became a U.S. citizen in 2020.
 Natasha Richardson
 Lyda Roberti
 Olesya Rulin
 Elena Satine
 Caterina Scorsone
 Izabella Scorupco – Born in Poland, raised in Sweden. Became a U.S. citizen in 2014.
 Jane Seymour – Born and raised in the United Kingdom. Became an American citizen in 2005.
 Norma Shearer
 Jean Simmons – Born and raised in the United Kingdom. Became a U.S. citizen in 1956.
 Marina Sirtis
 Alexis Smith – Born in Canada. Became a U.S. citizen in 1939.
 Cobie Smulders – Born in Canada. Became a U.S. citizen in 2020.
 Anna Sten
 Tammin Sursok – Born in South Africa,raised in Australia. Became a U.S. citizen in 2019.
 Jessica Tandy – Born and raised in the United Kingdom. Became a U.S. citizen in 1952.
 Holly Taylor
 Charlize Theron – Born in South Africa. Became a U.S. citizen in 2007.
 Tracey Ullman – Born in the United Kingdom. Became a U.S. citizen in 2006.
 Angélica Vale – Born and raised in Mexico. Became a U.S. citizen in 2016.
 Diana Van der Vlis
 Nia Vardalos
 Sofía Vergara – Born and raised in Colombia. Became a U.S. citizen in 2014.
 Vanessa Villela – Born in Mexico. Became a U.S. citizen in 2017.
 Sonya Walger – Born and raised in the United Kingdom. Became a U.S. citizen in 2013.
 Rachel Weisz – Born in the United Kingdom. Became a U.S. citizen in 2011.
 May Whitty
 Fay Wray – Born and raised in Canada. Became a U.S. citizen in 1933.

Comedians
 Samantha Bee - Born and raised in Canada. Became a U.S. citizen in 2014.
 Michael Blackson – Born and raised in Liberia. Became a U.S. citizen in 2021.
 Selma Diamond
 Bob Hope
 Tyler Labine
 Yakov Smirnoff - Born in the Soviet Union (modern day Ukraine). Became a U.S. citizen in 1986.

Dancers
 Mikhail Baryshnikov – Born and raised in Soviet Union (modern day Latvia). Became a U.S. citizen in 1986.
 Artem Chigvintsev – Born in The Soviet Union (modern day Russia). Became a U.S. citizen in 2014.
 Maksim Chmerkovskiy
 Valentin Chmerkovskiy
 Sasha Farber – Born in Russia, grew up in Australia. Became a U.S. citizen in 2020.
 Gonzalo Garcia – Born in Spain. Became a U.S. citizen in 2017.
 Alexander Godunov – Born in the Soviet Union (Modern day Russia). Became a U.S. citizen in 1987.
 José Limón – Born in Mexico. Became a U.S. citizen in 1946.
 Peta Murgatroyd – Born in New Zealand. Raised in Australia. Became a U.S. citizen in 2019.
 Gleb Savchenko
 Christine Shevchenko
 Emma Slater – Born and raised in the United Kingdom. Became a U.S. citizen in 2020.
 Karina Smirnoff – Born in The Soviet Union (modern day Ukraine). Became a U.S. citizen shortly after immigrating in 1993.
 Tamara Toumanova – Born and raised in Russia. Became a U.S. citizen in 1943.
 Louis Van Amstel – Born and raised in The Netherlands. Became a U.S. citizen in 1999.

Directors
 Frank Capra – Born in Italy. Became a U.S. citizen in 1920.
 Michael Curtiz – Born and raised in Austria-Hungary (modern day Hungary). Became an American citizen in 1933.
 John Farrow – Born in Australia. Became a U.S. citizen in 1947.
 Alfred Hitchcock - Born and raised in England. Became a U.S. citizen in 1955.
 Anatole Litvak
 Otto Preminger
 Gottfried Reinhardt
 Alik Sakharov

Producers
 Dino De Laurentiis – Born and raised in Italy. Became a U.S. citizen in 1986.
 Bruce Lansbury – Born in the United Kingdom. Became a U.S. citizen in 1954.
 Edgar Lansbury – Born in the United Kingdom. Became a U.S. citizen in 1954.
 Lorne Michaels

WWE
 Alberto Del Rio – Born in Mexico. Became a U.S. citizen in 2018.

Law enforcement
 Joaquín "Jack" García
 John Timoney

Media figures

Social media
 Hila Klein – Born in Israel. Became a U.S. citizen in 2019.

Television
 Peter Arnett
 Mariana Atencio – Born and raised in Venezuela. Became a U.S. citizen in 2020.
 Jillian Barberie – Born and raised in Canada. Became an American citizen in 2011.
 David Frum
 Brad Goreski
 Yolanda Hadid – Born and raised in The Netherlands. Became a U.S. citizen in 2013.
 Peter Jennings
 Alex Trebek – Born and raised in Canada. Became a U.S. citizen in 1998.
 Laura Trevelyan
 Richard Wolffe

Military
 Ming Chang – Born in China. Became a U.S. citizen after joining the U.S. navy.
 Louis Cukela
 Florent Groberg – Born in France. Became a U.S. citizen in 2001.
 Khalifa Haftar
 Mian Ghulam Jilani – Born and raised in Pakistan. Became a U.S. citizen in 1981.
 No Kum-sok – Born in modern-day North Korea. Immigrated to the U.S. in 1954 and later became a citizen.
 Henry Landau – Born in South Africa. Became a U.S. citizen in 1933.
 James I. Mestrovitch
 Thomas R. Sargent III – Born in the United Kingdom. Became a U.S. citizen in 1930.
 John Shalikashvili
 Michael Strank - Born in Czechoslovakia (modern day Slovakia). Became a U.S. citizen in 1935.
 Peter Tomich
 Lauri Törni – Born and raised in Finland. Became a U.S. citizen in 1957.
 Friedrich Wilhelm von Steuben – Born in Germany. Became a U.S. citizen following the American Revolutionary War.

Musicians
 Lina Abarbanell
 Josh Beech – Born in the United Kingdom. Became a U.S. citizen in 2019.
 Bleona - Born and raised in Albania. Became an American citizen in 2011.
 Igor Butman
 David Byrne - Born and raised in Scotland. Became a U.S. citizen in 2012.
 David Coverdale - Born and raised in England. Became an American citizen in 2007.
 Celia Cruz
 Sheena Easton - Born and raised in Scotland. Became a U.S. citizen in 1992.
 Flea
 Lita Ford
 Gregory Alan Isakov
 Tomo Miličević - Born in Yugoslavia (modern day Bosnia and Herzegovina). Became a U.S. citizen in the 1990s.
 French Montana – Born in Morocco. Became a U.S. citizen in 2018.
 Joon Park
 Neil Peart
 Trevor Rabin – Born and raised in South Africa. Became a U.S. citizen in 1991.
 Carlos Santana - Born in Mexico. Became a U.S. citizen in 1965.
 Gene Simmons
 Slash – Born in the United Kingdom. Became a U.S. citizen in 1996.
 Yma Sumac – Born and raised in Peru. Became an American citizen in 1955.
 Alex Van Halen   
 Eddie Van Halen

Singers
 Paul Anka – Born in Canada. Became a U.S. citizen in 1990.
 Alex Boyé – Born and raised in the United Kingdom. Became a U.S. citizen in 2012.
 Camila Cabello – Born in Cuba. Became an American citizen in 2008.
 Gloria Estefan – Born in Cuba. Became a U.S. citizen in 1974
 Billy Idol – Born and raised in the United Kingdom. Became a U.S. citizen in 2018.
 John Lydon – Born in the United kingdom. Became a U.S. citizen in 2013.
 Dave Matthews – Born and raised in South Africa. Became an American citizen in 1980.
 Alanis Morissette – Born and raised in Canada. Became a U.S. citizen in 2005.
 Tinka Milinović – Born and raised in Bosnia and Herzegovina. Became a U.S. citizen at the age of 18.
 Carly Smithson – Born in Ireland. Became a U.S. citizen in 2017.
 Yoo Seung-jun – Born and raised in South Korea. Became a U.S. citizen in 2002.
 Keith Urban
 Neil Young

Composers
 Irving Berlin
 Monte Carlo - Born and raised in Denmark. Became a U.S. citizen in 1914.
 Sansan Chien
 Percy Faith – Born and raised in Canada. Became a U.S. citizen in 1945.
 Loris Ohannes Chobanian
 Erich Wolfgang Korngold - Born in Austria-Hungary (modern day Czech Republic). Became a U.S. citizen in 1943.
 Miklós Rózsa – Born in Austria-Hungary (modern day Hungary). Became an American citizen in 1946.
 Kike Santander - Born and raised in Colombia. Became a U.S. citizen in 2004.
 Lalo Schifrin – Born and raised in Argentina. Became a U.S. citizen in 1969.
 Arnold Schoenberg
 Karl Weigl - Born and raised in Austria. Became an American citizen in 1943.

Pianist
 Victor Borge – Born and raised in Denmark. Became a U.S. citizen in 1948.
 Vladimir Horowitz - Born and raised in the Russian Empire (modern day Ukraine). Became a U.S. citizen in 1944.
 Mischa Levitzki
 Rene Paulo
 Arthur Rubinstein – Born in Poland. Became a U.S. citizen in 1946.
 Nina Svetlanova
 George Tremblay

Politics

Activists
 Rushan Abbas
 Carlos Arredondo – Born in Costa Rica. Became a U.S. citizen in 2006.
 Greta Beer – Born in Romania. Became a U.S. citizen in 1956.
 Ada Bello – Born in Cuba. Became a U.S. citizen in 1969.
 Pamela Harriman – Born in the United Kingdom. Became a U.S. citizen in 1971.
 Maria L. de Hernández
 Ayaan Hirsi Ali

Diplomats
 Zbigniew Brzezinski – Born in Poland. Became a U.S. citizen in 1958.

Political science
 Yascha Mounk
 Adam Ulam

Politicians
 Katcho Achadjian – Born in Lebanon to parents from Armenia. Became a U.S. citizen in 1982.
 Madeleine Albright – Born in Czechoslovakia (modern day Czech Republic). Became a U.S. citizen in 1957. 
 John Peter Altgeld
 Rudy Boschwitz
 Joseph Cao
 Salud Carbajal
 Peter Angelo Cavicchia
 Elaine Chao – Born in Taiwan. Became an American citizen at the age of 19.
 Fernando Cheung
 Robert Dale Owen – Born in Scotland. Became a U.S. citizen in 1825.
 John N. Dempsey
 Lincoln Díaz-Balart
 William P. Fitzpatrick
 Jennifer Granholm – Born in Canada. Became a U.S. citizen in 1980.
 Pramila Jayapal – Born in India. Became a U.S. citizen in 2000.
 Henry Kissinger – Born in Germany. Became a U.S. citizen in 1943 while serving in the U.S. army
 Raja Krishnamoorthi
 Tom Lantos – Born in Hungary. Became a U.S. citizen in 1954.
 Mel Martínez
 Paul O'Dwyer – Born in Ireland. Became a U.S. citizen in 1930.
 William O'Dwyer
 Victoria Spartz – Born in the Soviet Union (modern day Ukraine). Became a U.S. citizen in 2006.
 Leland Yee

Religious figures
 Chaim Zanvl Abramowitz 
 Evangeline Booth
 Frances Xavier Cabrini – Born in the Austria Empire (modern day Italy). Became a U.S. citizen in 1909.
 Bhante Dharmawara
 Oscar C. Eliason – Born in Sweden. Became an American citizen in 1915.
 Gavriel Holtzberg
 Menachem Mendel Schneerson
 Paramahansa Yogananda – Born and raised in India. Becamea U.S. citizen in 1949.

Science and academia

Astronomy
 Bart Bok – Born and raised in The Netherland. Became a U.S. citizen in 1938.
 Margaret Burbidge – Born in the United Kingdom. Became a U.S. citizen in 1977.
 Otto Struve – Born in Russian Empire (modern day Ukraine). Became an American citizen in 1927.

Biology
 Salvador Luria – Born and raised in Italy. Became a U.S. citizen in 1947.

Chemistry
 Albert Chan
 Basudeb DasSarma - Born in India (modern day Bangladesh). Became a U.S. citizen in 1972.

Economics
 Abhijit Banerjee
 W. Michael Blumenthal - Born and raised in Germany. Became a U.S. citizen in 1952.
 John Kenneth Galbraith - Born and raised in Canada. Became an American citizen in 1937.
 Asim Ijaz Khwaja
 Franco Modigliani – Born and raised in Italy. Became a U.S. citizen in 1946.
 Michele Boldrin

Engineering
 Roma Agrawal
 Viktor Belenko – Born and raised in Russia. Became an American citizen in 1980.
 Lodewijk van den Berg - Born and raised in The Netherlands. Became a U.S. citizen in 1975.
 Wernher von Braun - Born in Germany. Became a U.S. citizen in 1955.
 Philip K. Chapman – Born and raised in Australia. Became a U.S. citizen in the late 1960s.
 Kalpana Chawla – Born in India. Became an American citizen in 1991.
 Walter Haeussermann – Born and raised in Germany. Became a U.S. citizen in 1954.
 Thuan Pham
 Jesco von Puttkamer – Born and raised in Germany. Became a U.S. citizen in 1967.
 Ben Rich
 Andy Thomas - Born and raised in Australia. Became a U.S. citizen in 1986.

Mathematics
 Lamberto Cesari – Born and raised in Italy. became an American citizen in 1976.
 Bang-Yen Chen
 Samuel Eilenberg
 Ernst Hellinger – Born and raised in Germany. Became a U.S. citizen in 1944.
 Mark Kac - Born in the Russian Empire (modern day Ukraine). Became an America citizen in 1943.
 Leonid Khachiyan – Born and raised in the Soviet Union (modern day Russia). Became a U.S. citizen in 2000.
 Emil Leon Post
 John von Neumann – Born and raised in Hungary. Became an American citizen in 1937.
 Albert Nijenhuis – Born and raised in the Netherlands. Became a U.S. citizen in 1959.
 Ida Rhodes
 Stanisław Ulam - Born in Austria-Hungary (modern day Ukraine). Became a U.S. citizen in 1941.

Meteorology
 James Murdoch Austin – Born and raised in New Zealand. Became a U.S. citizen in 1946.

Philosophy
 Hannah Arendt
 Max Black – Born in Azerbaijan raised in the United Kingdom. Became a U.S. citizen in 1948.

Physics
 Ilesanmi Adesida
 Qanta A. Ahmed - Born and raised in the United Kingdom (specially England). Became a U.S. citizen in 2015.
 Ernest Ambler - Born and raised in the United Kingdom (specially England). Became an American citizen in 1957.
 Felix Bloch – Born and raised in Switzerland. Became a U.S. citizen in 1939.
 Ernest Courant
 F. J. Duarte
 Robley Dunglison – Born in the United Kingdom. Became a U.S. citizen in 1838.
 Albert Einstein – Born in Germany. Became a U.S. citizen in 1940.
 Enrico Fermi - Born and raised in Italy. Became a U.S. citizen in 1944.
 André Frédéric Cournand – Born and raised in France. Became an American citizen in 1941.
 Jim Yong Kim
 Bennet Omalu – Born and raised in Nigeria. Became a U.S. citizen in 2015.
 Yuri Orlov – Born and raised in the Soviet Union (modern day Russia). Became a U.S. citizen in 1993.
 Benjamin B. Rubinstein – Born in Finland. Became a U.S. citizen in 1957.
 Wolfgang Pauli – Born and raised in Austria-Hungary (modern day Austria). Became a U.S. citizen in 1946.
 Horst Ludwig Störmer
 Leana Wen – Born in China. Became a U.S. citizen in 2003.
 Emil Wolf
 Xiaoxing Xi

Psychology
 Carola B. Eisenberg – Born in Argentina. Became a U.S. citizen in 1949.
 Erik Erikson
 Boris M. Levinson – Born in the Russian Empire (modern day Lithuania). Became a U.S. citizen in 1930.
 Renee Rabinowitz
 Douglas G. Stuart - Born in Australia. Became an American citizen in 1961.
 Max Wertheimer

Sports

American football
 Morten Andersen
 Gunther Cunningham – Born in Germany. Became a U.S. citizen in 2010.
 L. P. Ladouceur – Born and raised in Canada. Became a U.S. citizen in 2019.
 Arthur Mosse – Born in Ireland. Became a U.S. citizen in 1937.
 Christian Okoye
 Igor Olshansky
 Fuad Reveiz – Born in Colombia. Became a U.S. citizen in 1986.
 Jan Stenerud

Athletics
 Abdihakem Abdirahman – Born in Somalia. Became a U.S. citizen in 2000.
 Gretel Bergmann – Born in Germany. Became a U.S. citizen in 1942.
 Hillary Bor - Born and raised in Kenya. Became a U.S. citizen after joining the U.S. military.
 Paul Chelimo – Born in Kenya. Became a U.S. citizen in 2014 while serving in the U.S. army.
 Kerron Clement – Born and raised in Trinidad and Tobago. Became a U.S. citizen in 2004.
 Colleen De Reuck – Born and raised in South Africa. Became a U.S. citizen in 2000.
 Sandra Farmer-Patrick
 Weini Kelati – Born in Eritrea. Became a U.S. citizen in 2021.
 Benard Keter
 Khalid Khannouchi – Born in Morocco. Became a U.S. citizen in 2000.
 Shadrack Kipchirchir
 Sally Kipyego – Born and raised in Kenya. Became a U.S. citizen in 2017.
 Leonard Korir
 Bernard Lagat - Born and raised in Kenya. Became a U.S. citizen in 2004.
 Lopez Lomong – Born and raised in Sudan (modern day South Sudan. Became a U.S. citizen in 2007.
 Guor Marial
 Sydney Maree
 Nadia Prasad – Born in France. Became a U.S. citizen in 2000.
 Stanisława Walasiewicz - Born in the Russian Empire (modern day Poland). Became a U.S. citizen in 1947.
 Futsum Zeinasellassie - Born in Eritrea. Became a U.S. citizen in 2016.

Baseball
 Jason Bay – Born in Canada. Became a U.S. citizen in 2009.
 Orlando Cabrera – Born in Colombia. Became an American citizen in 2011.
 Robinson Canó – Born and raised in The Dominican Republic. Became a U.S. citizen in 2012.
 Carlos Carrasco – Born and raised in Venezuela. Became a U.S. citizen in 2016. 
 Aroldis Chapman – Born in Cuba. Became a U.S. citizen in 2016.
 Yunel Escobar – Born and raised in Cuba. Became a U.S. citizen in 2017.
 José Fernández – Born in Cuba. Became a U.S. citizen in 2015.
 Ozzie Guillén – Born and raised in Venezuela. Became a U.S. citizen in 2006.
 Félix Hernández – Born in Venezuela. Became a U.S. citizen in 2018.
 José Iglesias – Born in Cuba. Became an American citizen in 2018.
 Leonys Martín – Born and raised in Cuba. Became a U.S. citizen in 2018.
 Oscar Mercado – Born in Colombia. Became a U.S. citizen in 2018.
 David Ortiz – Born and raised in the Dominican Republic. Became a U.S. citizen in 2008.
 Eddie Pérez – Born and raised in Venezuela. Became a U.S. citizen in 2014.
 Tony Pérez – Born and raised in Cuba. Became a U.S. citizen in 1971.
 Plácido Polanco – Born in the Dominican Republic. Became a U.S. citizen in 2008.
 Yasiel Puig – Born in Cuba. Became a U.S. citizen in 2019.
 Albert Pujols – Born in the Dominican Republic. Became a U.S. citizen in 2007.
 Hanley Ramírez – Born and raised in the Dominican Republic. Became a U.S. citizen in 2019.
 Manny Ramirez – Born in the Dominican Republic. Became a U.S. citizen in 2004.
 Mariano Rivera – Born and raised in Panama. Became a U.S. citizen in 2015.
 Chico Ruiz – Born in Cuba. Became a U.S. citizen in 1972.
 Carlos Santana – Born in the Dominican Republic. Became a U.S. citizen in 2019.
 Fernando Valenzuela – Born and raised in Mexico. Became a U.S. citizen in 2015.

Basketball
 Kristine Anigwe – Born in the United Kingdom to parents from Nigeria. Became a U.S. citizen in 2014.
 Geno Auriemma – Born in Italy. Became an American citizen in 1994.
 Hank Beenders
 Rolando Blackman
 Brandon Clarke
 James Donaldson
 Patrick Ewing
 Adonal Foyle - Born and raised in Saint Vincent and the Grenadines. Became a U.S. citizen in 2007.
 Olga Firsova – Born in the Soviet Union (modern day Ukraine). Became a U.S. citizen in 2008.
 Ernie Grunfeld – Born in Romania. Became a U.S. citizen in 1976.
 Adnan Hodžić
 Zydrunas Ilgauskas – Born and raised in Lithuania. Became a U.S. citizen in 2013.
 Enes Kanter Freedom - Born in Switzerland raised in Turkey. Became a U.S. citizen in 2021.
 Andrei Kirilenko – Born and raised in Russia. Became a U.S. citizen in 2011.
 Damir Krupalija
 Tom Meschery
 Sean Marks – Born and raised in New Zealand. Became an American citizen in 2007.
 Dikembe Mutombo
 Hakeem Olajuwon - Born and raised in Nigeria. Became a U.S. citizen in 1993.
 Ticha Penicheiro – Born and raised in Portugal. Became a U.S. citizen in 2013.
 Juan Ignacio Sánchez
 Goran Suton - Born in Bosnia and Herzegovina. Became a U.S. citizen in 2006.
 Mychal Thompson
 Tristan Thompson - Born and raised in Canada. Became an American citizen in 2020.

Boxing
 Eduardo Garcia
 Kid Kaplan
 Dmitry Salita

Climbing
 Fritz Wiessner – Born and raised in Germany. Became a U.S. citizen in 1935.

Figure skating
 Rafael Arutyunyan – Born and raised in the Soviet Union (modern day Georgia). Became a U.S. citizen in 2019.
 Daniil Barantsev
 Nina Bates
 Tanith Belbin White - Born and raised in Canada. Became a U.S. citizen in 2005.
 Jane Bugaeva – Born in Russia. Became a U.S. citizen in 2007.
 Alexandr Chichkov
 Oleg Fediukov
 Mathew Gates
 Kyoko Ina
 Rena Inoue - Born and raised in Japan. Became a U.S. citizen in 2005.
 Chuen-Gun Lee
 Gustave Lussi – Born in Switzerland. Became a U.S. citizen in 1927.
 Alexandr Kirsanov
 Sergei Magerovski
 Ksenia Makarova – Born in Russia. Became an American citizen in 2013.
 Denis Petukhov - Born and raised in Russia. Became a U.S. citizen in 2005.
 Larisa Selezneva – Born and raised in the Soviet Union (modern day Russia). Became a U.S. citizen in 2013.
 Gorsha Sur
 Peter Tchernyshev – Born and raised in the Soviet Union (modern day Russia). Became a U.S. citizen in 2001.

Golf
 Tommy Armour – Born and raised in the United Kingdom specifically Scotland. Became a U.S. citizen in 1942.
 Bobby Cruickshank
 Harry Cooper
 Jim Ferrier – Born and raised in Australia. Became a U.S. citizen in 1944.
 Jenny Lidback – Born in Peru to parents from Sweden. Became a U.S. citizen in 2003.
 Pearl Sinn – Born in South Korea. Became a U.S. citizen at the age of 14.
 Macdonald Smith – Born and raised in the United Kingdom specifically Scotland. Became a U.S. citizen in 1918.
 Annika Sörenstam - Born and raised in Sweden. Became a U.S. citizen in 2006.

Gymnastics
 Svetlana Boginskaya
 Nadia Comăneci – Born and raised in Romania. Became a U.S. citizen in 2001.
 Annia Hatch – Born in Cuba. Became a U.S. citizen in 2001.
 Irina Kazakova
 Olga Korbut – Born and raised in The Soviet Union (modern day Belarus). Became a U.S. citizen in 2000. 
 Anna Kotchneva 
 Valeri Liukin – Born in The Soviet Union (modern day Kazakhstan). Became a U.S. citizen in 2000.
 Henrietta Ónodi – Born and raised in Hungary. Became a U.S. citizen later in life.
 Elena Piskun

Ice hockey
 Joseph Barss - Born in British India raised in Canada. Became a U.S. citizen in 1930.
 Martin Biron – Born and raised in Canada. Became a U.S. citizen in 2017.
 Martin Brodeur – Born and raised in Canada. Became a naturalized U.S. citizen in 2009
 Valeri Bure – Born and raised in Russia. Became a U.S. citizen in 2001.
 Bill Clement – Born and raised in Canada. Became a U.S. citizen in 2010.
 Tony Esposito - Born and raised in Canada. Became a U.S. citizen in 1981.
 Ruslan Fedotenko
 Mike Fisher – Born and raised in Canada. Became a U.S. citizen in 2019.
 Wayne Gretzky
 Arthur Kaliyev
 Tom Karalis - Born and raised in Canada. Became a U.S. citizen following Ice Hockey retirement.
 Darius Kasparaitis
 Ian Laperrière – Born and raised in Canada. Became an American citizen in 2011.
 Claude Lemieux – Born and raised in Canada. Became a U.S. citizen in 2009.
 Mario Lemieux
 Joel Quenneville - Born and raised in Canada. Became an American citizen in 2011.
 Chico Resch
 Ulf Samuelsson
 Joe Thornton - Born and raised in Canada. Became a U.S. citizen in 2009.
 Bryan Trottier

Mixed martial arts
 Rafael dos Anjos – Born and raised in Brazil. Became a U.S. citizen in 2019.
 Andrei Arlovski
 Vitor Belfort – Born and raised in Brazil. Became a U.S. citizen in 2018.
 Cris Cyborg – Born and raised in Brazil. Became a U.S. citizen in 2016.
 Anderson Silva – Born and raised in Brazil. Became a U.S. citizen in 2019.
 Glover Teixeira – Born and raised in Brazil. Became a U.S. citizen in 2020.
 Kamaru Usman
 Sodiq Yusuff – Born in Nigeria. Became a U.S. citizen in 2020.

Motor sports
 Aldo Andretti
 Mario Andretti - Born in Italy. Became a U.S. citizen in 1964.
 Luigi Chinetti - Born and raised in Italy. Became a U.S. citizen in 1950.

Rugby
 Takudzwa Ngwenya

Skateboarding
 Letícia Bufoni – Born and raised in Brazil. Became a U.S. citizen in 2021.

Soccer / association football 
 Freddy Adu – Born in Ghana. Became a U.S. citizen in 2003.
 Juan Agudelo
 Osvaldo Alonso – Born and raised in Cuba. Became a U.S. citizen in 2012.
 Vlatko Andonovski – Born in modern-day North Macedonia. Became a U.S. citizen in 2015.
 Hadji Barry – Born and raised in Guinea. Became a U.S. citizen in 2018.
 Fernando Clavijo – Born in Uruguay. Became a U.S. citizen in 1987.
 Jeff Cunningham – Born in Jamaica. Became an American citizen in 2001.
 Emmanuel D'Andrea - Born in Venezuela, raised in Puerto Rico. Became a U.S. citizen at the age of 10.
 Mix Diskerud
 Benny Feilhaber
 Baggio Hušidić - Born and raised in Yugoslavia (modern day Bosnia and Herzegovina). Became a U.S. citizen while in college.
 Donna-Kay Henry
 Dema Kovalenko 
 Sydney Leroux
 Carlos Llamosa – Born in Colombia. Became a U.S. citizen in 1998.
 Catarina Macario – Born in Brazil. Became a U.S. citizen in 2020.
 Kekuta Manneh – Born in Gambia. Became an American citizen in 2016.
 Mick McDermott
 Janusz Michallik – Born in Poland. Became a U.S. citizen in 1991.
 Darlington Nagbe – Born in Liberia. Became a U.S. citizen in 2015.
 Teresa Noyola
 Brian Quinn
 Andrew Parkinson
 Hugo Pérez - Born in El Salvador. Became a U.S. citizen as a kid.
 Preki - Born in Yugoslavia (modern day Serbia). Became a U.S. citizen in 1996.
 David Regis – Born in Martinique. Became a U.S. citizen in 1998.
 Havana Solaun
 Roy Wegerle – Born and raised in South Africa. Became a U.S. citizen in 1991.
 Gedion Zelalem – Born in Germany to parents from Ethiopia. Became a U.S. citizen in 2014.
 Kia Zolgharnain – Born in Iran. Became a U.S. citizen in 1994.

Swimming
 John Davies – Born and raised in Australia. Became a U.S. citizen in 1960.
 Mariya Koroleva
 Lenny Krayzelburg - Born and raised in Ukraine. Became an American citizen in 1995.
 Jay Litherland - Born and raised in Japan. Became a U.S. citizen while in high school.
 Philip Scholz - Born and raised in Germany. Became a U.S. citizen in 2007.
 Darian Townsend - Born and raised in South Africa. Became a U.S. citizen in 2014.
 Arkady Vyatchanin – Born and raised in Russia. Became a U.S. citizen in 2017.
 Otto Wahle - Born in Austrian empire (modern day Austria). Became a U.S. citizen in 1906.
 Alberto Zorrilla – Born and raised in Argentina. Became a U.S. citizen in 1954.

Tennis
 Alex Bogomolov Jr.
 Kevin Curren – Born and raised in South Africa. Became a U.S. citizen 1985.
 Mariaan de Swardt – Born and raised in South Africa. Became a U.S. citizen in 2006.
 Amer Delić
 Edward Dewhurst – Born and raised in Australia. Became a U.S. citizen in 1924.
 Cliff Drysdale - Born and raised in South Africa. Became a U.S. citizen following retirement of tennis career.
 Tommy Haas – Born in Germany. Became a U.S. citizen in 2010.
 Liezel Huber – Born in South Africa. Became a U.S. citizen in 2007.
 Anna Kournikova – Born in Russia. Became a U.S. citizen in 2010.
 Johan Kriek – Born in South Africa. Became a U.S. citizen in 1982.
 Denis Kudla
 Varvara Lepchenko – Born in The Soviet Union (modern day Uzbekistan). Became an American citizen in 2012.
 Ivan Lendl – Born and raised in Czechoslovakia (modern day Czech Republic). Became a U.S. citizen in 1992.
 Tetiana Luzhanska
 Molla Mallory
 Martina Navratilova – Born and raised in Czechoslovakia (modern day Czech Republic). Became an American citizen in 1981.
 Alex Olmedo – Born in Peru. Became a U.S. citizen later in life.
 Bernarda Pera
 Fred Perry – Born and raised in the United Kingdom. Became a U.S. citizen in 1939.
 Monica Seles – Born in Yugoslavia (modern day Serbia). Became a U.S. citizen in 1994.
 Anna Tatishvili – Born in the country of Georgia. Became a U.S. citizen in 2014.

Volleyball
 Bojana Todorović

Weightlifting
 Mike Karchut
 Richard Tom
 Walter Zagurski

Winter Sports
 Kaillie Humphries - Born and raised in Canada. Became a U.S. citizen in 2022.

Wrestling
 Edwin Bibby – Born and raised in the United Kingdom. Became a U.S. citizen in 1900.
 Ildar Hafizov - Born and raised in Uzbekistan. Became a U.S. citizen after enlisting in the U.S. Army in 2015.
 Rocky Johnson

References

 *